Adolph Eilert "Ad" Wenke (January 22, 1898 – March 3, 1961) was a player in the National Football League and a state supreme court justice in the state of Nebraska. Of German ancestry, Wenke played college football for the Nebraska Cornhuskers. He played with the Milwaukee Badgers during the 1923 NFL season. Wenke later became an attorney and a judge of the 9th Judicial District Court, and was appointed by Governor Dwight Griswold to serve as a justice of the Nebraska Supreme Court, from 1943 until his death in 1961.

References

External links

1898 births
1961 deaths
American people of German descent
Milwaukee Badgers players
Nebraska Cornhuskers football players
Justices of the Nebraska Supreme Court
People from Pender, Nebraska
20th-century American judges